Tae Yoon (born 14 February 1992) is a South Korean footballer who currently plays as a goalkeeper for Carlos A. Mannucci in the Peruvian Segunda División. Besides South Korea, he has played in England, Portugal, India, and Peru.

Career

United Sikkim
Tae signed for United Sikkim F.C. on 5 August 2012 officially and made his debut for United Sikkim on 6 October 2012 against Salgaocar F.C. at the Paljor Stadium in the first round of the I-League and United SIkkim's first match ever in the I-League; United Sikkim won the match 3–2.

On 17 January 2013, it was announced that Tae had left United Sikkim after compensation for his contract had been paid. It was also said by Tae that now he would trial with some clubs in the Segunda Division in Spain.

Peru
After going more than two years without a club, on 31 March 2015 it was announced that Tae had signed with Peruvian Segunda División side Carlos A. Mannucci.

Career statistics

Club
Statistics accurate as of 17 January 2013

References

1992 births
Living people
I-League players
Association football goalkeepers
Expatriate footballers in India
Expatriate footballers in Peru
Expatriate footballers in Portugal
Expatriate footballers in England
Expatriate footballers in Japan
South Korean footballers
South Korean expatriate sportspeople in India
United Sikkim F.C. players